This is a list of the municipalities of Åland sorted by area as of 1 January 2006:

 159,94 km2: Saltvik
 143,40 km2: Jomala
 140,09 km2: Hammarland
 137,21 km2: Föglö
 130,18 km2: Finström
 113,95 km2: Lemland
 112,63 km2: Sund
 109,18 km2: Eckerö
 108,53 km2: Brändö
 102,09 km2: Vårdö
 99,79 km2: Kumlinge
 87,22 km2: Geta
 64,16 km2: Kökar
 36,35 km2: Lumparland
 28,07 km2: Sottunga
 11,79 km2: Mariehamn

External links 
 The official ÅSUB website

 
Aland
Municipalities by area
Aland
Aland